The Journal of School Nursing is a bimonthly peer-reviewed nursing journal covering the field of school nursing. The journal's editor-in-chief is Martha Dewey Bergren (University of Illinois-Chicago). The journal was established in 1984 and is published by SAGE Publications in association with the National Association of School Nursing.

Abstracting and indexing
The journal is abstracted and indexed in Scopus and the Social Sciences Citation Index. According to the Journal Citation Reports, the journal has a 2021 impact factor of 2.835.

References

External links 

National Association of School Nursing

SAGE Publishing academic journals
English-language journals
General nursing journals
Bimonthly journals
Publications established in 2000